The Benjamin D. Gullett House is a historic structure in Eutaw, Alabama.  The house was placed on the National Register of Historic Places as part of the Antebellum Homes in Eutaw Thematic Resource on April 2, 1982, due to its architectural significance.

References

National Register of Historic Places in Greene County, Alabama
Houses on the National Register of Historic Places in Alabama
Houses completed in 1841
Houses in Greene County, Alabama